Pinckney Township is an inactive township in Warren County, in the U.S. state of Missouri.

Pinckney Township was erected in 1833, taking its name from the community of Pinckney, Missouri.

References

Townships in Missouri
Townships in Warren County, Missouri